Ulten is a comune (municipality) in South Tyrol in northern Italy, located about  west of Bolzano.

History

Coat-of-arms
The shield is party per pale of argent; the first part shows half Tyrolean eagle; the second part is tierced per fess of sable and argent. It is the arms of the Counts of Eschenlch and the Tyrolean eagle represents the membership to the Tirol. The emblem was granted in 1967.

Society

Linguistic distribution
According to the 2011 census, 99.40% of the population speak German, 0.53% Italian and 0.07% Ladin as first language.

Demographic evolution

 note: in 1897 the largest village of Ulten St. Pankraz became a Gemeinde on its own.

References

External links
 Homepage of the municipality

Municipalities of South Tyrol